Harold Bender may refer to:

Harold H. Bender (1882–1951), professor of philology at Princeton University
Harold S. Bender (1897–1962), professor of theology at Goshen College and Goshen Biblical Seminary